The Thomas Cup, sometimes called the World Men's Team Championships, is an international badminton competition among teams representing member nations of the Badminton World Federation (BWF), the sport's global governing body. The championships have been conducted every two years since the 1982, amended from being conducted every three years since the first tournament held in 1948–1949.

The final phase of the tournament involves 12 teams competing at venues within the host nation and is played concurrently with the final phase of the world women's team championships, the Uber Cup (first held in 1956–1957). Since 1984, the two Cups have been held jointly at the various stages of play. Thomas Cup and, to a lesser extent, Uber Cup are some of the world's "biggest" and most prestigious regularly held badminton events in terms of player and fan interest.

Of the 30 Thomas Cup tournaments held since 1948–1949, only six countries have won the title. Indonesia is the most successful team, having won 14 times. China, which did not begin to compete before 1982, trails Indonesia with 10 titles, while Malaysia has won 5 titles.

Japan became the fourth country to win the Thomas Cup after beating Malaysia 3–2 in the 2014 final. Denmark became the first European and the fifth nation overall to win the Thomas Cup after beating Indonesia 3–2 in the 2016 final. This marked the first and only time a non-Asian team won the championship. India is the current champion, and the sixth nation, having won its first title after beating title holders Indonesia 3–0 in the 2022 edition.

History

First Thomas Cup

The Thomas Cup competition was the idea of Sir George Alan Thomas, a highly successful English badminton player of the early 1900s, who was inspired by tennis's Davis Cup, and football's (soccer's) World Cup first held in 1930. His idea was well received at the general meeting of the International Badminton Federation (now Badminton World Federation) in 1939.

In the same year, Sir George presented the Thomas Cup, officially known as The International Badminton Championship Challenge Cup, produced by Atkin Bros of London at the cost of US$40,000. The Cup stands 28 inches high and 16 inches across at its widest and consists of three parts: a plinth (pedestal), a bowl, and a lid with a player figure.

The first tournament was originally planned for 1941–1942 (badminton seasons in the northern hemisphere traditionally ran from the autumn of one calendar year to the spring of the next) but was delayed due to World War II. Sir George's dream was realized in 1948–1949 when ten national teams participated in the first Thomas Cup competition. Three qualifying zones were established: Pan America, Europe, and the Pacific, though Malaya (now Malaysia) was the only Pacific zone participant. In a format that would last until 1984, all ties (matches between countries) would consist of nine individual matches, with the victorious team needing to win at least five of these contests. The top two singles players for each side faced both of the top two players for the opposite side, accounting for four matches. A fifth singles match took place between the third-ranked singles players for each team. Finally, two doubles pairings for each side played both of the doubles pairings for the opposite side, accounting for four more matches. Each tie was normally contested over two days, four matches on the first day and five on the next. The United States and Denmark won their respective zone qualifications and thus joined Malaya for the inter-zone ties.

The inter-zone ties were held in the United Kingdom. As the tournament used a knockout (single elimination) system, rather than a round-robin system, one country, Denmark, was given a bye in the first round. Malaya defeated the United States 6–3 in a highly competitive match played in Glasgow, Scotland (curiously, none of the players on either side had previously seen any of the players on the other side play). Of note, this tie marked the first of only three ever matches between the American Dave Freeman and Malayan Wong Peng Soon, the two greatest singles players of the early post-war period. In the final round held in Preston, England, Malaya beat Denmark 8–1 and became the first country to win a Thomas Cup.

Development
During the next several Thomas Cup competitions, the number of participating countries grew and a fourth qualifying zone was added. The former Pacific zone was converted into Asian and Australasian zones for the 1954–1955 tournament. Beginning with the second tournament in 1951–1952, zone winners contested to determine a challenger for the reigning champion. Until 1964, the Cup-holding nation always hosted these inter-zone ties but was exempt from them, and from the earlier intra-zone matches, needing only to defend its title, at home, in a single, conclusive challenge round tie.

With veterans such as Wong Peng Soon, Ooi Teik Hock, and Ong Poh Lim leading the way, Malaya comfortably retained the Cup in Singapore against the United States (7–2) in 1952 and Denmark (8–1) in 1955. Malaya's reign, however, was ended in 1958 (3 matches to 6) by an upstart Indonesia led by Ferry Sonneville and Tan Joe Hok. Indonesia successfully defended its title in 1961 against a young team from Thailand which surprised Denmark in the inter-zone final.

Amid some complaints of home-court advantage (and "home climate" advantage as far as the Europeans were concerned), a rules change effective in 1964 prevented the reigning champion from defending the Cup at home twice in succession. The challenge round played in Tokyo, Japan that year was nonetheless controversial because the Danish challengers were barracked and severely harassed during play by young Indonesian fans. A narrow 5–4 Indonesian victory was upheld by the IBF (BWF) over Denmark's protests. When the challenge round returned to Jakarta in 1967, a resurgent Malaysia led Indonesia 4–3 (despite the spectacular debut of Indonesia's young Rudy Hartono) when crowd interference during the eighth match prompted tournament referee Herbert Scheele to halt the play. When Indonesia rejected an IBF (BWF) decision to resume the contest in New Zealand, Malaysia was awarded the outstanding matches (6–3), and with them, the Thomas Cup.

After 1967, the IBF (BWF) further reduced the advantages accorded to the reigning champion by eliminating the old challenge round system. Instead, the defending champion would receive a bye only to an inter-zone semifinal berth and have to earn its way into the decisive final match. This change, however, proved to be a little obstacle for a rampant Indonesia. With a cadre of talented players, including Hartono and doubles wizards such as Tjun Tjun and Christian Hadinata, Indonesia dominated the Thomas Cup competition throughout the 1970s. Its successful effort to regain the cup in 1969–1970 was a struggle, but in the competitions ending in 1973, 1976, and 1979, Indonesia swept its ties by winning a remarkable 51 of 54 individual matches.

In 1982, however, China burst onto the scene as a new member of the IBF (BWF). Having long before developed players as good as, or better than, any in the world (especially in singles), China defeated Indonesia in a classic 5–4 final in London. It began an era that continues to the present, which has generally seen either China or Indonesia capture or retain the Cup. The pattern has been broken four times by Malaysia in 1992, Japan in 2014, Denmark in 2016 and India in 2022.

Revised format
In the early 1980s the IBF (BWF) revamped the formats of both Thomas Cup and the women's world team  championship, the Uber Cup. Starting in 1984, they were held concurrently, every two years not three, with equivalent phases of the two competitions held at the same venues and times. Ties at all stages of the Thomas Cup were trimmed from nine matches to five, played in one day not two. Lineups continued to consist of three singles players and two doubles teams, but each now played a single match against the opposing team's counterpart.

Qualification
The old knockout (single elimination) zone qualification system in which each tie was played at a separate venue and time was eliminated. Instead, common qualifying venues brought many teams together to contend in group round-robin ties followed by playoffs between group leaders. As few as one or as many as three teams from a given venue (depending on the previously assessed strength of its field) would qualify for the final phase of the competition which until 2004 was limited to eight teams. The number of qualifying venues prior to 2004 varied between two and four and their sites basically reflected the long existent loci of badminton strength in the Far East and (to a lesser extent) in Europe (see chart below).

The European qualifying venue usually hosted the highest number of teams and to streamline play and create more competitive ties. A two-tiered system was eventually instituted there. Weaker badminton countries played-off in groups for the right to contest with the stronger ones. To have an easier road to the inter-zone competition, strong Asian teams sometimes competed outside of their "natural" qualification venue. Rising power South Korea, for example, won qualifications held in North America in 1986 and in 1988.

In 2014, the qualification format was changed to include a total of 16 teams in the Thomas & Uber Cup Finals. The normal, earlier used Thomas & Uber Cup Qualification was discontinued for a year, with the BWF arguing that basically the Thomas & Uber Cup Finals had too many matches that were not competitive due to teams qualifying through a continental quota system. Teams were invited to the 2014 Thomas & Uber Cup Finals from their World Ranking position. A continental quota was introduced, so a minimum of one team (either Thomas Cup or Uber Cup team) from each continent would qualify. Furthermore, a minimum of three teams from Asia and Europe would qualify in both Thomas Cup and Uber Cup. The total number of teams from 2014 on would be 16 in both Thomas and Uber Cup Finals.

From 2016 onwards, however, teams qualified once again based on their performances in the Continental Team Championships. All five continental winners, besides semi-finalists from Asia and Europe, and the hosts and defending champions, automatically qualify. The rest of the 16 places will be taken by teams according to their BWF world team ranking (cumulative world ranking of their top three singles and top two doubles pairs). If the trophy holder and/or Host Member Association also take part and occupy a qualifying position in its respective continental qualifying tournament, the next one or two highest ranked teams (excluding already automatically qualified teams) from the BWF World Team rankings in the same continent would also qualify.
                                                                                   
Below shows the qualification slots in tournament history:

Final tournament
From 1984 through 2002, the final phase of Thomas Cup competition brought eight competing teams together. These included the defending champion and the host nation exempt from earlier qualification ties. The format of this final phase largely mirrored that of the qualifying venues. The eight teams were divided into pools or groups of four. Round-robin play within each group determined first and second place group finishers who then advanced to the semifinals. Each semifinal tie pitted the top finisher in one group against the second-place finisher in the other, with the winners proceeding to the championship match. A playoff for third place between losing semifinalists was instituted in 1984 but was dropped in 1990.

In 2004, the BWF increased the number of Thomas Cup qualifying venues to five, one for each of five regional confederations (Africa, Asia, Europe, Oceania, and Pan America) that it had established. It also increased the number of teams qualifying for the final phase of competition to twelve. While all confederations were guaranteed to send at least one qualifier to the final phase, strong regions such as Asia might send several (see chart above). At the finals, the 12 qualifying teams were divided into four groups of three teams with round-robin play within each group. Round-robin winners were then placed in separate quarter-final berths of a knockout (single elimination) tournament to await opponents determined by matches between the second-place finisher of one group and the third-place finisher of another. The draw was played out and the winner of this tournament within a tournament became the Thomas Cup champion. In 2007, BWF decided to have Thomas and Uber Cup finals separated again but the proposal was abandoned.

From 2014, 16 teams were presented in the tournament. Teams no longer qualify via the continental championships. Instead, teams will be invited based on their World Ranking position. The new structure also ensured a minimum of one team from each continent and three teams from Asia and Europe will qualify. However, BWF revert to old qualifying system in 2016 tournament.

Results

1949–1982

1984–1988

1990–present

Successful national teams
Only six countries, Malaysia (formerly Malaya), Indonesia, China, Japan, Denmark, and India have ever won the Thomas Cup. The first three each won the first competition that it entered: Malaya, the initial contest in 1949; Indonesia, the 1958 contest against Malaya; and China, the 1982 contest over Indonesia.

Indonesia leads in total titles with 14, with the most recent one in 2020 following a nearly two-decade drought. They won four consecutive titles from 1970 to 1979 and five consecutive titles from 1994 to 2002. Indonesia's ten-year reign as champion was ended by the resurgence of China in 2004 when they won the title in Jakarta. Indonesia has played in the decisive final tie (team match) on 21 occasions. For the first time since their first entrance in 1958, Indonesia failed to reach the top four in 2012.

China has captured the Cup on ten occasions, including five consecutively from 2004 to 2012. Since 1982, when they first entered the competition, China has won the most titles and has consistently placed among the top four teams, except in 2016 and 2022 when they lost in the quarter-final.

Malaysia has won five times, the last being in 1992. They have played in the final tie on 14 occasions. It has been runners-up the most times, losing nine finals.

In 2014, Japan became the fourth country to have captured the Cup, doing so in its first appearance in the championship round. Japan had finished in the top four on four previous occasions: 1967, 1979, 2010, and 2012; and in 1970, they had given the eventual champion Indonesia its toughest battle, going down 4–5 in the final of the Asian qualifier.

Despite its small population, Denmark has traditionally been Europe's most potent power in men's badminton and the only non-Asian team to have won the Thomas Cup. Being the only European country to have played in the final tie, it had previously finished second eight times, spanning from the first competition in 1949 through the 2006 tournament.

India nearly reached the final twice in the 1950s. Despite some fine individual players, it has lacked the depth, particularly in doubles, to seriously contend for the cup. They finally managed to win the title in 2022.

The United States, a power in the early days of international badminton (especially in women's competition), finished second to Malaya in 1952 but thereafter steadily fell behind the leading badminton countries.

Among the other contenders, South Korea has the best record. Rising to prominence in the 1980s and especially strong in doubles, it had reached the "final four" seven times before finishing second in 2008 and 2012. In Europe, England and Sweden have often joined Denmark in advancing to the final phase of Thomas Cup competition since 1984. England, traditionally more successful in women's play than in men's, had its best showing in 1984 with a third-place finish. Sweden, whose greatest badminton success spanned from the late 1960s to the mid-1980s, has yet to advance to the semi-finals of Thomas Cup.

Below is the list of nine nations that have finished in the top two in the Thomas Cup.

* = hosts
** = including Malaya

Team appearances at the final stages

As of the 2022 championship, 29 teams have advanced to the final tournaments over the competition's history. Among them, Denmark has reached this final stage in all 32 competitions (and without ever receiving a bye to it). Indonesia and China have also advanced to the final stage in each competition that they have entered. Geographically, 10 Asian nations have qualified to play at the final venue. Nine European nations have done so. The United States, Canada, Peru and Mexico are the only Pan-American teams to have reached this stage, and New Zealand, Australia and Tahiti have been the only teams to represent Oceania. South Africa, Nigeria, and Algeria have qualified from the African zone. The 2020 Thomas Cup saw Tahiti debuted in the championship.

Below is the list of teams that have appeared in the final stage of Thomas Cup as of the 2022 tournament.

32 times

29 times

21 times

20 times

16 times

15 times

13 times

11 times

10 times

8 times

7 times

5 times

4 times

3 times

2 times

1 time

References and footnotes

External links
BWF: Thomas Cup

 
Recurring sporting events established in 1948
World championships in badminton